The Santa Cruz Islands are a group of islands in the Pacific Ocean, part of Temotu Province of the nation of Solomon Islands discovered by the Spaniards.  They lie approximately 250 miles (400 km) to the southeast of the Solomon Islands archipelago. The Santa Cruz Islands lie just north of the archipelago of Vanuatu, and are considered part of the Vanuatu rain forests ecoregion.

Geography
The term Santa Cruz Islands is sometimes used to encompass all of the islands of the present-day Solomon Islands province of Temotu.

The largest island is Nendö, which is also known as Santa Cruz Island proper (505.5 km2, highest point , population over 5000). Lata, located on Nendö, is the largest town, and the capital of Temotu province.

Other islands belonging to the Santa Cruz group are Vanikoro (173.2 km2, population 800, which is actually two islands, Banie and its small neighbor Teanu) and Utupua (69.0 km2, highest point , population 848).

The Santa Cruz Islands are less than five million years old, and were pushed upward by the tectonic subduction of the northward-moving Indo-Australian Plate under the Pacific Plate. The islands are mostly composed of limestone and volcanic ash over limestone. The highest point in the Santa Cruz Islands is on Vanikoro, .

Culture

Languages
The native languages of the islands are classified as the Reef Islands–Santa Cruz languages, within the Oceanic subgroup of the Austronesian language family.

Tepukei (ocean-going outrigger canoes)

Some Polynesian societies of eastern Solomon Islands built ocean-going outrigger canoes known as Tepukei. In 1966 Gerd Koch, a German anthropologist, carried out research at Graciosa Bay on Nendö Island (Ndende/Ndeni) in the Santa Cruz Islands and on Pileni and Fenualoa in the Reef Islands, and returned with documentary film, photographic and audio material. The films that Koch completed are now held by the German National Library of Science and Technology (TIB) in Hanover. He brought back to the Ethnological Museum of Berlin the last still complete Tepukei from the Santa Cruz Islands. In 1971 Koch published Die Materielle Kultur der Santa Cruz-Inseln.

Navigators
Navigators from the Santa Cruz islands retained traditional navigation techniques into the 20th century, which skills were also held by navigators of the Caroline Islands. In 1969, Tevake accompanied David Henry Lewis on his ketch Isbjorn from Taumako using traditional navigation techniques by studying wave patterns and made landfall at Fenualoa, having navigated for  without being able to view the stars, due to cloud cover. On a second voyage from Nifiloli to Vanikoro, Tevake navigated by the stars, wave patterns, and the patterns of bioluminescence that indicated the direction in which islands were located.

Contact with other cultures
The islands were visited by Spanish explorer Álvaro de Mendaña, the first European to sight them, on his second Pacific expedition in 1595. Mendaña started a colony on Nendö which he named Santa Cruz, at the place also named by the Spaniards as Graciosa Bay, and he died there in 1596.

World War II
During the Pacific War, the Battle of the Santa Cruz Islands was fought north of the Santa Cruz group and some seaplanes were based in Graciosa Bay's US Navy seaplane base, with one reportedly having sunk there.  VP-23,  Patrol Squadron 23, known as the Seahawks was stationed at Seaplane Base with Consolidated PBY Catalina, including black Cats, night fighters. Chemical ordnance stored on Vanikoro Island was not completely removed until the 1990s.

2013 Solomon Islands earthquake
The Santa Cruz Islands were affected by the 2013 Solomon Islands earthquake and subsequent tsunami. The airport and low-lying areas were flooded, killing nine people, five of them elderly and one a child. More than 100 houses on the island were damaged, and the water and electricity services were interrupted. It was reported that almost all houses in Nela village were washed away, and some homes in Venga village were shifted by water.

See also
American Caesar: Douglas MacArthur, 1880-1964, by William Manchester, p. 320
Melanesia
Oceania
Pacific Islands

Notes

References
 Santa Cruz and the Reef Islands, by W.C. O'Ferrall—1908 account with many illustrations by missionary in Santa Cruz from 1897 to 1904.
 John Seach: Solomon Islands page

External links

 
 

Archipelagoes of the Pacific Ocean
Islands of the Solomon Islands
Former Spanish colonies